The Enigmata Eusebii (riddles of Eusebius) are a collection of sixty Latin, hexametrical riddles composed in early medieval England, probably in the eighth century.

Example 
An example of Eusebius's work is enigma 42, on the dragon:

Authorship 
The manuscripts of the riddles name the author as Eusebius. This person has traditionally been identified as Hwætberht, the Abbot of Monkwearmouth-Jarrow Priory, based on Bede's identification of Hwætberht with the cognomen of 'Eusebius' in his Commentary on I Samuel. However, the identification with Hwætberht has been questioned by several scholars, including Emily V Thornbury, who has suggested that a Kentish author might be likely.

Origins 
The Enigmata Eusebii seem to have been composed to expand on the forty riddles of Tatwine, a collection composed by the eighth-century Mercian priest and archbishop Tatwine, perhaps specifically to bring their number up to one hundred: the riddles of Tatwine and Eusebius both survive in the same two manuscripts, and in both the riddles of Eusebius are alongside Tatwine's. These are the early 11th-century London, British Library, Royal 12.Cxxiii (fols. 121v-7r) and the mid-11th-century Cambridge, University Library, Gg.5.35 (fols. 374v-77v). Both of these collections were almost certainly inspired by the slightly earlier riddles of Aldhelm, another collection of one hundred Latin riddles. Many of Eusebius's riddles (and his predecessors') are based on the encyclopaedic writing of Isidore of Seville.

Contents 
Riddles 1-4 of Eusebius's riddles are on the chain of being, from God to Man, 5-11 mostly on cosmological phenomena, 12-29 a miscellaneous collection mostly of objects, 30-36 mostly on writing, and 37-60 on animals. The following is a complete list.

References 

Riddles
Latin poetry